Guy Kassa Gnabouyou (born December 1, 1989) is a French-Ivorian footballer who plays as a forward.

Career	
Gnabouyou made his debut with Olympique de Marseille in the 2007–08 Ligue 1 season against Le Mans UC72.
	
In 2017, Gnabouyou signed for National League team Torquay United after impressing in training sessions.

Personal life
His sister Marie-Paule Gnabouyou is a team handball player.

Honours
Marseille
Trophée des Champions: 2010

References

External links
 

1989 births
Living people
French sportspeople of Ivorian descent
Footballers from Marseille
French footballers
Association football forwards
Ligue 1 players
Sliema Wanderers F.C. players
Liga II players